Idham Chalid (27 August 1921 – 11 July 2010) was an Indonesian politician, religious leader, and minister, who served as Chairman of the People's Consultative Assembly  and Chairman of the People's Representative Council from 1972 until 1977. He was also a prominent leader of the Nahdlatul Ulama (NU) and leader of the United Development Party (PPP), from 1956 until 1984.

He was appointed a National Hero of Indonesia, along with 6 other figures, based on Presidential Decree No. 113/TK/Tahun 2011 dated November 7, 2011. On December 19, 2016, he was immortalized in the new redesign of Rp. 5.000, new rupiah banknote.

Early life and education

Early life 
Idham Chalid was born on August 27, 1921 in Setui, Tanah Bumbu regency, in the southeast portion of South Kalimantan. He is the eldest of five children. His father was Muhammad Chalid, a person from Amuntai, about 200 kilometers from Banjarmasin. When he was six years old, his family moved to Amuntai and lived in the Tangga Ulin area, his father's ancestral hometown.

Education 
He was admitted to the second grade of Amuntai People's School (SR). After graduating from there, he continued his education to Madrasah Ar-Rasyidiyyah in 1922. Idham continued his education at the Gontor Islamic Boarding School located in Ponorogo, East Java. Becoming fluent in a number of languages, including Japanese. After graduating from Gontor, 1943, he continued his education in Jakarta. In the capital, his fluency resulted in him being employed as a translator between the Japanese and the Nahdlatul Ulama (NU).

Around this time, he graduated from an Islamic teaching college, and would go on to work as a teacher at Islamic institutes from 1943-1945.

Political career

Early political career 
Following the Proclamation of Independence, he joined the Indonesian People's Union, a local party, which then moved to the Indonesian Muslim Union. After working in local government, in 1950 he became a member of the People's Representative Council. After a short period as secretary general of the Nahdlatul Ulama, in 1956 he became chairman, a position he held until 1984. In  March 1956, he was appointed second deputy prime minister in the Second Ali Sastroamidjojo Cabinet, and four years later became deputy chairman of the People's Consultative Assembly.

The New Order 
Following the fall of President Sukarno, he served in the Ampera Cabinet and Revised Ampera Cabinet as minister of people's welfare from July 1966 until June 1968. He was reappointed to the First Development Cabinet as state minister for people's welfare. From 1972 to 1977, he was both speaker of the People's Representative Council and chairman of the People's Consultative Assembly.

National Hero 

Idham died in Cipete, South Jakarta on 11 July 2010 ten years after suffering a stroke. He was buried in the grounds of the Darul Qur`an Islamic Boarding School complex in Cisarua, Bogor. He was named a National Hero of Indonesia based on 113/TK/Tahun Presidential Decree No. 2011 dated 7 November 2011. He became the third Banjarese to receive the title.

Following the issuance of Presidential Decree No. 31 of 5 September 2016, Bank Indonesia introduced seven new banknote designs featuring national heroes. Idham Chalid's face is featured on the obverse of the Rp 5,000 banknote.

Notes

References

 
 
 
 
 
 
 

1921 births
2010 deaths
Indonesian Islamic religious leaders
Indonesian Muslims
Indonesian Sunni Muslims
Nahdlatul Ulama
Sunni Muslim scholars of Islam
National Heroes of Indonesia
Speakers of the People's Consultative Assembly